Nonverbal learning disability (NVLD) is a neurodevelopmental disorder characterized by core deficits in visual-spatial processing in the presence of intact verbal ability. Additional diagnostic criteria include Average to Superior verbal intelligence and deficits in visuoconstruction abilities, fine-motor coordination, mathematical reasoning, visuospatial memory and social skills. In clinical settings, some diagnoses of attention deficit hyperactivity disorder would be more appropriately classified as NVLD.

NVLD's symptoms are very similar to both Autism Spectrum Disorder (ASD), specifically high-functioning autism, and ADHD, with which it shares an exceptionally high comorbidity rate. For this reason, it has been often the case that NVLD is overlooked in patients in favor of solely ADHD or ASD.

Signs and symptoms

Considered to be neurologically based, nonverbal learning disorder is characterized by:
 impairments in visuospatial processing
 discrepancy between Average to Superior verbal abilities and impaired nonverbal abilities such as:
 visuoconstruction
 fine motor coordination
 mathematical reasoning
 visuospatial memory
 socioemotional skills
People with NVLD may have trouble understanding charts, reading maps, assembling jigsaw puzzles, and using an analog clock to tell time. "Clumsiness" is not unusual in people with NVLD, especially children, and it may take a child with NVLD longer than usual to learn how to tie shoelaces or to ride a bicycle.

At the beginning of their school careers, children with symptoms of NVLD struggle with tasks that require eye–hand coordination, such as coloring and using scissors, but often excel at memorizing verbal content, spelling, and reading once the shapes of the letters are learned. A child with NVLD's Average or Superior verbal skills can be misattributed to attention deficit hyperactivity disorder, defiant behavior, inattention, or lack of effort.  Early researchers in the syndrome of NVLD Johnson and Myklebust characterize how the children appear in a classroom: "An example is the child who fails to learn the meaning of the actions of others....We categorize this child as having a deficiency in social perception, meaning that he has an inability which precludes acquiring the significance of basic nonverbal aspects of daily living, though his verbal level of intelligence falls within or above the average."

In the adolescent years, when schoolwork becomes more abstract and the executive demands for time management, organization, and social interactions increase, students with NVLD begin to struggle. They focus on separate details and struggle to summarize information or to integrate ideas into a coherent whole, and they struggle to apply knowledge to other situations, to infer implicit information, to make predictions, and to organize information logically.

As adults, tasks such as driving a car or navigating to an unfamiliar location may be difficult.  Difficulty with keeping track of responsibilities or managing social interactions may affect job performance.

People with NVLD may also fit the diagnostic criteria of dyscalculia, dysgraphia, or dyspraxia.

Cause 
Research suggests that there is an association with an imbalance of neural activity in the right hemisphere of the brain connected to the white matter.

Diagnosis
Nonverbal learning disability (NVLD) is characterized by core deficits in visualspatial processing in the presence of intact verbal ability.  Additional diagnostic criteria include Average to Superior verbal intelligence and deficits in visuoconstruction abilities, fine-motor coordination, mathematical reasoning, visuospatial memory and social skills.

"While NVLD is not classified into any distinct diagnosis in DSM-5 (American Psychiatric Association, 2013) or ICD-10 (World Health Organization, 1992), it does have a robust research base."  "The majority of researchers and clinicians agree that the profile of NLD clearly exists...but they disagree on the need for a specific clinical category and on the criteria for its identification." (One researcher notes, "just because we cannot reasonably place such children into our present classification scheme does not mean they do not exist.")

Assorted diagnoses have been discussed as sharing symptoms with NVLD.  In some cases, especially the form of autism previously called Asperger syndrome, the overlap can be so significant as to render NVLD a pointless duplication in the mind of its detractors, with the only difference being that NVLD criteria do not mention the presence or absence of either repetitive behaviors or narrow subject-matter interests.  (These are not required for a diagnosis of autism.) These overlapping conditions include, among others:
 attention deficit hyperactivity disorder (ADHD)
 autism spectrum disorders, especially high-functioning autism
 developmental coordination disorder
 social communication disorder
 right hemisphere brain damage and developmental right hemisphere syndrome
 social-emotional processing disorder
 Gerstmann syndrome
There is diagnostic overlap between nonverbal learning disorder and autism spectrum disorder, and some clinicians and researchers consider them to be the same condition.  In clinical settings, some diagnoses of attention deficit hyperactivity disorder would be more appropriately classified as NVLD.

History 
While various nonverbal learning difficulties were recognized since early studies in child neurology, there is ongoing debate as to whether/or the extent to which existing conceptions of NVLD provide a valid diagnostic framework.

As presented in 1967, "nonverbal disabilities" (p. 44) or "disorders of nonverbal learning" was a category encompassing non-linguistic learning problems. "Nonverbal learning disabilities" were further discussed by Myklebust in 1975 as representing a subtype of learning "disability" with a range of presentations involving "mainly visual cognitive processing," social imperception, a gap between higher verbal ability and lower nonverbal processing, as well as difficulty with handwriting. Later neuropsychologist Byron Rourke sought to develop consistent criteria with a theory and model of brain functioning that would establish NVLD as a distinct syndrome (1989).

Questions remain about how best to frame the perceptual, cognitive and motor issues associated with NVLD.

See also
 Alexithymia – difficulty with understanding emotions
 Children's Nonverbal Learning Disabilities Scale
 Deficits in attention, motor control and perception

References

Further reading

Books

By Authors with NVLD

External links 
 NVLD Project

Learning disabilities
Pervasive developmental disorders